Malmö Fotbollförening, also known simply as Malmö FF, is a Swedish professional football club based in Malmö. The club have participated in 41 editions of the club competitions governed by UEFA, the chief authority for football across Europe. These include 19 seasons in the European Cup and Champions League, 18 seasons in the UEFA Cup and Europa League, five seasons in the Cup Winners' Cup and one season in the Intertoto Cup. Malmö have also taken part in one club competition organised by the global federation FIFA, the Intercontinental Cup, in 1979. Counting all of the 149 games the side have played in UEFA competitions since their first entry into the European Cup in the 1964–65 season, the team's record stands at 55 wins, 32 draws and 62 defeats. The club's most recent participation in a continental competition was in the 21–22 season, when they played in the group stage of the 2021–2022 UEFA Champions League.

The club play their home matches at the Stadion in Malmö; for UEFA matches, the capacity is 21,000 all-seated while for Swedish league matches 3,000 of these seats are removed to create standing room for 6,000 spectators. Malmö's 11–0 victory over Pezoporikos Larnaca of Cyprus in the 1973–74 European Cup Winners' Cup is the club's most decisive win in European competitions, while the team's heaviest defeat is 8–0, against Spanish club Real Madrid in the 2015–16 UEFA Champions League. With 53 caps, Jan Möller has appeared in the most UEFA matches for Malmö, while Markus Rosenberg have scored the most goals with 23. Malmö FF's most successful European campaign culminated in the club's contesting of the 1979 European Cup Final against Nottingham Forest at the Olympic Stadium in Munich; Malmö lost 1–0. As of the 2018–19 season, the club is ranked 66th in the UEFA club coefficient.

Key

 S = Seasons
 Pld = Played
 W = Games won
 D = Games drawn
 L = Games lost
 GF = Goals for
 GA = Goals against
 GD = Goal difference
 H = Home ground
 A = Away ground
 N = Neutral ground
 Final = Final
 SF = Semi-finals
 QF = Quarter-finals
 R32 = Round of 32
 Group = Group stage
 PO = Play-off round
 R3 = Round 3
 R2 = Round 2
 R1 = Round 1
 QR3 = Third qualification round
 QR2 = Second qualification round
 QR1 = First qualification round
 QR = Qualification round
 aet = Match determined after extra time
 ag = Match determined by away goals rule
 ap = Match determined by penalty shoot-out
 Agg = Aggregated score
 Ref = Reference

Malmö's score is noted first in all of the match results given below.

Overall record

Updated as of 8 September 2022

By competition

Source: Uefa.com

S =  Season Pld = Matches played W = Matches won D = Matches drawn L = Matches lost GF = Goals for GA = Goals against GD = Goal Difference

List of opponents

By opponent club nationality

By club
The following list details Malmö FF's all-time record against clubs they have met three or more times in European competition, that is on more than one occasion. The club and its country are given, as well as the number of games played (Pld), won by Malmö (W), drawn (D) and lost by Malmö (L), goals for Malmö (GF), goals against Malmö (GA) and Malmö's goal difference (GD). Statistics are correct as of the 2022–23 season and include goals scored during extra time where applicable; in these games, the result given is the result at the end of extra time.

Matches

European Champion Clubs' Cup / UEFA Champions League
The European Champion Clubs' Cup was founded in 1955 and was renamed the UEFA Champions League in 1992. Malmö FF first entered the competition in 1964–65, qualifying by virtue of their position at the top of the Allsvenskan table midway through the 1964 season. As Allsvenskan is played between April and October of each year, out of step with most European leagues, modern practice sees each season's Allsvenskan champions qualify for the UEFA Champions League competition starting in August the following year. Malmö FF's most notable achievement in this competition, and in all European tournaments, is reaching the final at the end of the 1978–79 season. In the 2014–15 season the side passed the qualifying rounds for the first time since the competition was re–branded. The following is a complete list of matches played by Malmö FF in the European Cup and the UEFA Champions League; it includes the season of the tournament, the stage, the opponent club and its country, the date, the venue and the score. It is up to date as of the 2018–19 season.

UEFA Cup / UEFA Europa League
The UEFA Cup, founded in 1971, was renamed the UEFA Europa League in 2009. Malmö FF first contested this competition in the 1977–78 season having qualified as Allsvenskan runners-up in 1976. The club competed in the competition for the first time since its rebranding to the UEFA Europa League during the 2011–12 season. The following is a complete list of matches played by Malmö FF in the UEFA Cup and UEFA Europa League. It includes the tournament season, the stage, the opponent club and its country, the date, the venue and the score. Statistics are correct as of the 2022–23 season.

European Cup Winners' Cup / UEFA Cup Winners' Cup
The European Cup Winners' Cup was formed in 1960, with the word "European" replaced by "UEFA" in 1994; it was abolished in 1999. Malmö FF first played in the Cup Winners' Cup in the 1973–74 season as the 1973 winners of the Svenska Cupen. The following is a complete list of matches played by Malmö FF in the Cup Winners' Cup. It includes the season of the tournament, the stage, the opponent club and its country, the date, the venue and the score.

Inter-Cities Fairs Cup
The Inter-Cities Fairs Cup was founded in 1955 and ran each season until it was replaced by the UEFA Cup in 1971. Malmö FF first competed in the Fairs Cup for the 1965–66 season and played in the last edition of the competition in the 1970–71 season. The following is a complete list of matches played by Malmö FF in the Fairs Cup. It includes the season of the tournament, the stage, the opponent club and its country, the date, the venue and the score.

UEFA Intertoto Cup
The UEFA Intertoto Cup was founded in 1995 as a replacement for the original Intertoto Cup, and ran each season until its abolishment in 2008. Malmö FF's only appearance was in 2004, having finished 3rd in Allsvenskan the previous year.

Intercontinental Cup / FIFA Club World Cup
The Intercontinental Cup was founded in 1960 and replaced by the FIFA Club World Cup in 2004. Malmö FF's only appearance in either to date was in 1979, when Nottingham Forest, who had defeated Malmö in the 1979 European Cup final, refused to take part. As the defeated finalists, Malmö FF took the English club's place in the two-legged tie against Olimpia of Paraguay.

European Ranking

UEFA Ranking & Coefficient 

The following data indicates Malmö FF coefficient rankings since 1999.

As of 19 June 2022

ClubElo Ranking 
As of 19 December 2021

Footnotes

References

General

 

Specific

Malmö FF
Swedish football clubs in international competitions